Happy Socks is a Swedish manufacturer and retailer of socks, underwear, and swimwear. The company was founded in 2008 by Mikael Söderlindh and Viktor Tell who respectively took on the roles as CEO and creative director.  In 2017, Palamon Capital Partners acquired the majority share and Stefan Fragner became CEO. Their merchandise is sold in 90-plus countries, with 12,000 points of sale, as well as online, and over 100 Happy Socks stores. 

In addition to its headquarters in central Stockholm, Sweden, in 2018, the company opened its first office abroad in New York City, followed by an office in Munich, Germany in January 2019 in order to operate all wholesale accounts directly.

Company history
Happy Socks began in April 2008, when Mikael Söderlindh, an advertising executive, and Viktor Tell, an illustrator and graphic designer, came up with the idea of colorful, printed socks. Three weeks later, they began production in a Turkish factory. The socks launched for a price point of $10 and were initially sold on the company’s own website. In the first year, Happy Socks' turnover was €1,000,000 (US$1,136,750). Sales doubled the next year. Since then the company has grown about 50% annually.

In 2016, the brand generated retail sales of $106.4 million.

The company opened a new headquarters in 2017. Called the Happy House, the six-story building is located in central Stockholm. The same year, private equity firm Palamon Capital Partners acquired a majority stake from Scope Growth III.  At the time, they invested $81.2 million in Happy Socks stock, and Palamon invested about $4.5 million of growth capital that the founders used to build namesake stores around the world.

As of 2018, the brand had sold more than 40 million socks worldwide. Happy Socks expanded to produce underwear and kids socks in 2014, as well as an athletic collection aimed at sneaker wearers and a dressed collection for men more into tailoring in 2015. Later in 2017, they launched Hysteria, a fashion collection in materials such as slinky viscose, glitter, and nylon that is manufactured in Portugal and Italy. With Happy Socks already in upscale stores like Barneys New York and Opening Ceremony, this new collection designed by associate creative director, Paula Maso, moved Happy Socks into retailers such as Selfridges, John Lewis, Urban Outfitters Tessuti, Bloomingdales, Galeries Lafayette, Voo Berlin, and 10 Corso Como.

By the end of 2018, Happy Socks had opened 100 concept stores in cities such as Paris, London, Barcelona, Los Angeles, Stockholm, and Tokyo. In December, the brand opened its third New York City location in Times Square to add to its Soho and Williamsburg, Brooklyn facilities. In May 2019, Happy Socks opened their second Happy Socks store in Los Angeles. This concept store situated in Silver Lake, Los Angeles is also home to The Rabbit Hole, a creative hub for the brand where a small team, which includes both the founders, work on special projects.
 
Happy Socks began producing men's swim trunks in 2018. In Spring 2019, Happy Socks expanded the swimwear to include a women's line, slider footwear, beach bag, towel and pool float, all using the vibrant prints for which the company is known.

Celebrity partnerships
Collaborations have always been an important part of the brand's DNA. In addition to the Happy Socks original line, the brand had attracted a number of celebrities who would collaborate on creative projects and sock designs. In 2013, David LaChapelle photographed the fall marketing campaign, which featured male and female dancers with socks and nothing else.

Film director Robert Rodriguez, known for El Mariachi, From Dusk Till Dawn, and the Spy Kids franchise, created “Sock ‘Em Dead,” a short promotional movie starring Madison Davenport (From Dusk Till Dawn: The Series) as an actress making a vampire film who utilizes socks as a weapon. Danny Trejo and Wilmer Valderrama also star. Rodriguez's sock designs were vampires.

Video director Tim Erem partnered with Happy Socks to make a promotional video called "Happy Holidays" during 2018 that starred a tap-dancing Pedro Pascal, and choreography by Michael Rooney.

Marking its 10th anniversary in 2018, Happy Socks released designs that paid tribute to Andy Warhol, a collaboration with recording artist Wiz Khalifa, and a second  Beatles series, this one celebrating the 50th anniversary of the group's film, Yellow Submarine. In addition, the company has collaborated with the Elton John AIDS Foundation and released Keith Haring socks and underwear.

Happy Socks' other collaborations include Iris Apfel, Ellen Von Unwerth, and André Saraiva; brands like Adidas, Pharrell's Billionaire Boys Club, and Giles Deacon; and other musicians A$AP Rocky, Miike Snow, Steve Aoki and Rolling Stones. 

In April 2019, Happy Socks released a short film collaboration with David Hasselhoff called "The Hoff's Day Off" that includes swimwear in colourful prints and summer accessories for men and women. Hasselhoff stars in the accompanying video campaign.

See also

List of sock manufacturers

References

External links
 

Clothing companies of Sweden
Companies based in Stockholm
Socks
Hosiery brands